Lea Antonoplis and Barbara Jordan won in the final 5–7, 6–4, 7–5 against Rosalyn Fairbank and Candy Reynolds.

Seeds
Champion seeds are indicated in bold text while text in italics indicates the round in which those seeds were eliminated.

 Kathleen Horvath /  Yvonne Vermaak (semifinals)
 Lea Antonoplis /  Barbara Jordan (champions)
 Rosalyn Fairbank /  Candy Reynolds (final)
 Patricia Medrado /  Cláudia Monteiro (quarterfinals)

Draw

External links
 1983 Virginia Slims of Indianapolis Doubles Draw

Virginia Slims of Indianapolis
1983 Virginia Slims World Championship Series